Paulet St John may refer to:

Paulet St John, 3rd Earl of Bolingbroke  (1634 – 1711), English politician
Paulet St John, 8th Baron St John of Bletso (died 1714), English peer
Sir Paulet St John, 1st Baronet (1704–1780), English Member of Parliament for Hampshire and Winchester